Bruno Michel Santana (born 1 June 1999) is a Brazilian footballer who plays for as an attacking midfielder for Guarani.

Career statistics

Club

Notes

References

External links

1999 births
Living people
Brazilian footballers
Brazil youth international footballers
Brazilian expatriate footballers
Association football midfielders
Sport Club Corinthians Paulista players
São Bernardo Futebol Clube players
Club Athletico Paranaense players
Ohod Club players
Clube Atlético Mineiro players
Figueirense FC players
Saudi Professional League players
Brazilian expatriate sportspeople in Saudi Arabia
Expatriate footballers in Saudi Arabia